Yên Thế is a rural district of Bắc Giang province in the Northeast region of Vietnam. As of 2019 the district had a population of 110,920. The district covers an area of 301 km2. The district capital lies at Phồn Xương. The district is also the site of the Yên Thế Insurrection.

History
The area was the base of the Yên Thế Insurrection which lasted from 1887 to 1913.

Economy 
The district's economy mainly focuses around agriculture and industry. The district grows fruit trees and is famous for growing Cam sành. Currently the government is building factories in Bố Hạ, however the area faces pollution problems.

Administrative divisions
The district is divided into two townships, Phồn Xương and Bố Hạ, and communes:

 Đồng Vương
 Canh Nậu
 Đồng Kỳ
 Hương Vĩ
 Đông Sơn
 Xuân Lương
 Tam Tiến
 Tiến Thắng
 Tân Hiệp
 Tam Hiệp
 An Thượng
 Đồng Lạc
 Hồng Kỳ
 Đồng Hưu
 Tân Sỏi
 Đồng Tiến
 Đồng Tâm

Agriculture
The famous product of this district is cam sành - a hardy variety of southern ginseng which grows on the mountain of Chung Sơn in Yên Thế district.

References

Districts of Bắc Giang province